Zetron, Inc. is an American company that manufactures integrated communications systems. Founded in 1980, formerly a subsidiary of JVCKenwood, in May 2021 it was purchased by Codan Communications. Its products are for use by Emergency and Public Safety Agencies (Fire, Ambulance and Police), Utilities and Transportation Companies.

Products 
 Radio Dispatch Systems
 E-9-1-1 Call Taking Systems
 Fire station alerting and Dispatch Systems
 CAD and GIS Mapping System - Computer-aided Dispatch (CAD) & Geographic Information System (GIS) Systems
 Specialized integrated communications 
 Paging Systems

History 

 1980: Zetron is founded by Milt Zeutschel and John Reece.
 1981: Introduces paging products for volunteer fire departments (CE-1000).
 1987: Introduces Series 4000, the first user programmable microprocessor-based radio dispatch console.
 1990: Opens European office.
 1996: Introduces the first integrated radio dispatch and 9-1-1 call taking solution.
 2000: Zetron acquired the ACOM Business Unit from Plessey Asia Pacific Pty Ltd 
 2001: The Advanced Communication System (Acom) is introduced, expanding to large-scaled dispatch center capability.  
 2002: ACOM based VSCS is fully commissioned as the communications component of The Australian Advanced Air Traffic System 
 2004: IP-based interface is delivered between Acom and M/A-Com's OpenSky.
 2007: Acquired by the Japanese company Kenwood Corporation (now JVCKenwood).
 2007: Zetron becomes the first vendor to support the P25 CSSI Console interface.
 2008: New IP-based Fire Station Alerting system begins shipping.
 2017: Established the strategic partnership with Harris Corporation company for emergency dispatch console system.
 2020: Celebrates 40 years in business.
 2021: Purchased by Codan Communications, the communications subsidiary of the Codan Group.

Notes

Radio technology
Amateur radio companies
Companies based in Redmond, Washington
Electronics companies established in 1980
Electronics companies of the United States
2007 mergers and acquisitions
2021 mergers and acquisitions
American subsidiaries of foreign companies